Magdeline Moyengwa (born 31 March 2001) is a Botswanan weightlifter. She is the first female weightlifter from Botswana to represent her country at the World Weightlifting Championships and the Summer Olympics.

Career 

In 2019, she represented Botswana at the African Games held in Rabat, Morocco. In that same year, she also competed in the women's 59 kg event at the 2019 World Weightlifting Championships in Pattaya, Thailand.

In 2021, she won the bronze medal in the women's 59 kg event at the African Weightlifting Championships held in Nairobi, Kenya. In July 2021, she represented Botswana at the 2020 Summer Olympics in Tokyo, Japan. She competed in the women's 59 kg event. She lifted 70 kg in the Snatch and she did not register a result in the Clean & Jerk.

Achievements

References

External links 
 

Living people
2001 births
Place of birth missing (living people)
Botswana female weightlifters
Competitors at the 2019 African Games
African Games competitors for Botswana
Weightlifters at the 2020 Summer Olympics
Olympic weightlifters of Botswana
African Weightlifting Championships medalists